The Battle of Lomas Valentinas (also known as the Battle of Itá Ybaté) was fought in the Central Department of Paraguay on December 21–27, 1868. The Paraguayan Army, led personally by president Francisco Solano López, were decisively defeated, though López managed to escape. On 30 December 1868, the Paraguayan garrison at Angostura, with 1,907 men, surrendered to the Allies.

Battle
Marshal Caxias had left Villeta at 02:00 on the 21st, and was ready to storm the Lomas Valentinas range by noon.  Two columns of infantry, one under general José Luís Mena Barreto attacking the western defenses at Itá Ybaté, and another under general  aided by cavalry under general Andrade Neves attacking the northern defenses at Loma Acosta, where the hill of Cumbarity was located. The hill was taken by sundown.

On December 22, Argentine and Uruguayan troops advanced towards Lomas Auxilio. Marshal Caxias spent the 23rd reorganizing his battalions. On the 24th, Caxias demanded the surrender of López, which he refused. The Allied assault commenced again with dawn on the 25th and the 26th. The Paraguayan defenses were finally taken on the 27th.

Women 
Nurse Ramona Martínez was enslaved by López, but due to her work fighting and encouraging troops at the battle, became known as "the American Joan of Arc".

Aftermath
López made his escape with the Aca Vera cavalry acting as his escort. Generals Resquín and Bernardino Caballero also escaped. This meant the war would continue.

Gallery

References

Conflicts in 1868
Battles of the Paraguayan War
Battles involving Paraguay
Battles involving Uruguay
Battles involving Brazil
Battles involving Argentina
December 1868 events
History of Central Department